Passenger is a 1963 Polish feature film directed by Andrzej Munk. When Munk died in a car crash during production, the unfinished film was assembled for release by directors Witold Lesiewicz and Andrzej Brzozowski.

Passenger, using the form of a documentary, dramatizes the memories of a fictional SS officer (played by Aleksandra Śląska) who had served at the Auschwitz concentration camp during World War II. The Passenger examines the nature of oppressor and victim within the microcosm of a German extermination camp during the Jewish Holocaust

Plot

The Passenger begins in 1960, fifteen years after the end of World War II. The setting is a transatlantic voyage aboard a luxury liner en route from South America to Europe.

Lisa Kretschmer (Alexandra Śląska), a former concentration camp SS officer, has a chance encounter with a fellow passenger who was one of her inmates at the camp, Marta (Anna Ciepielewska). Aboard the vessel, the roles of Liza and Marta are more of less reversed. Marta is in a position to expose the former Nazi as a war criminal, and if not to the authorities, at least to Liza’s husband, who is ignorant of her past. 
The meeting unleashes a cascade of memories for Liza, in which she struggles to revisit the events at the extermination center, and the nature of her behavior towards Marta. In a series of flashbacks, Liza’s internal narrative, which serves to rationalize her role, clashes with memories of the systematic murder of men, woman and children that characterized the Holocaust. The complexities of the relationship between perpetrator and victim reveals the degradation of Marta, who survived by accommodating herself to her oppressors.

Production history

Munk, at the age of 39, died in a car accident while the film was in production and the completed scenes were combined from parts of original footage and screenplay sketches by Witold Lesiewicz. The methods used are explained in a voice-over during the course of the film, so its unfinished state itself takes a documentary form. Parts of the film were shot at Auschwitz. The source for The Passenger was a radio drama titled Passenger from Cabin Number 45, written by Zofia Posmysz-Piasecka in 1959.

Posmysz's play was later reworked into a novel. It was published in 1962 as Pasażerka.

When the work was made into an opera in 1968, American audiences were first alerted to Munk's impressive cinematic oeuvre.

Cast
 Aleksandra Śląska - Lisa Kretschmer, former SS Aufseherin at Auschwitz 
 Anna Ciepielewska - Marta, the Polish inmate
 Janusz Bylczynski - Capo
 Krystyna Dubielowna
 Anna Golebiowska - Auschwitz Prisoner
 Barbara Horawianka - Nurse
 Anna Jaraczówna - Capo
 Maria Koscialkowska - Guard, Inga Weniger
 Andrzej Krasicki - Commission Member
 Jan Kreczmar - Walter Kretschmer, Lisa's husband
 Irena Malkiewicz - Oberaufseherin Madel
 Izabella Olszewska
 Leon Pietraszkiewicz - Lagerkommandant Grabner
 Kazimierz Rudzki - Commission Member
 Wanda Swaryczewska

Awards
The film Passenger was entered into the 1964 Cannes Film Festival where it won a FIPRESCI Award. The film was also selected as the Polish entry for the Best Foreign Language Film at the 37th Academy Awards.

See also
 List of submissions to the 37th Academy Awards for Best Foreign Language Film
 List of Polish submissions for the Academy Award for Best Foreign Language Film

Footnotes

Sources 
Niemitz, Dorota. 2014. The legacy of postwar Polish filmmaker Andrzej Munk. World Socialist Web Site. 13 October, 2014. Retrieved 8 July, 2022.

External links 

 

1963 films
Polish black-and-white films
Films directed by Andrzej Munk
Films directed by Witold Lesiewicz
Holocaust films
1960s Polish-language films
Polish films based on plays
Polish historical drama films
1960s historical drama films
1963 drama films